The 2016 FIBA Oceania Under-18 Championship for Women was the qualifying tournament for FIBA Oceania at the 2017 FIBA Under-19 World Championship for Women. The tournament was held in Suva, Fiji from December 5 to December 10. Australia beat New Zealand in the final, 107–52, to earn the country's 7th consecutive gold in this event.

Participating teams 
  (Hosts)

Venue 
 Vodafone Arena, Suva

Preliminary round
All times given are local time (UTC+13)

Group A

Group B

Classification round
All times given are local time (UTC+13).

Classification 5–8

Seventh place game

Fifth place game

Final round
All times given are local time (UTC+13).

Semifinals

Third place game

Final

Awards 

All-Tournament Team
  Monique Conti
  Jazmin Shelley
  Ezi Magbegor
  Akiene Reed
  Losalina Katia

Grand Final MVP
  Zitina Aokuso

Final ranking

References

External links
 2016 FIBA Oceania U-18 Championship for Women

FIBA Oceania Under-18 Championship for Women
Oceania
2016–17 in Oceanian basketball
2016 in Fijian sport
International basketball competitions hosted by Fiji
2016 in youth sport